En las buenas y en las malas is a 2019 Mexican comedy-drama film directed by Gabriel Barragán Sentíes. The film premiered on 15 March 2019, and is stars Zuria Vega, and Alberto Guerra. The plot revolves around Sebastián and Valeria. One day, Valeria learns that she is pregnant and Sebastian decides to ask her to marry him. Everything is going perfect until Pamela appears, a young woman who works with him and is determined to seduce him. It is an adaptation of the Chilean film Qué pena tu boda, and sequel to Qué pena tu vida.

Cast 
 Zuria Vega as Valeria
 Alberto Guerra as Sebastián
 Macarena Achaga as Pamela
 Ignacia Allamand as Sandra
 José Alonso as Miguel
 Regina Blandón as Ale
 Diana Bracho as Elena
 Fernanda Castillo as Theatre actress
 Christian Chávez as Alberto
 Pablo Cruz as Erik
 Erik Hayser as Roy
 Ariel Levy as Alonso
 Natalia Téllez as Carolina

References

External links 
 
 

Mexican comedy-drama films
Film remakes 
2019 comedy-drama films
2019 films
2010s Mexican films
2010s Spanish-language films